First Church of Christ, Scientist, located at 309 East Avenue, in Elyria, Ohio, in the United States is an historic structure that on July 18, 1975, was added to the National Register of Historic Places. As of 2018 it is now known as Christian Science Society of Elyria-Lorain.

National register listing
First Church Of Christ, Scientist (added 1975 - Building - #75001460)
309 East Ave., Elyria
Historic Significance: 	Architecture/Engineering
Architect, builder, or engineer: 	Unknown
Architectural Style: 	Late Victorian
Area of Significance: 	Architecture
Period of Significance: 	1900-1924
Owner: 	Private
Historic Function: 	Religion
Historic Sub-function: 	Religious Structure
Current Function: 	Religion
Current Sub-function: 	Religious Structure

History
First Church of Christ, Scientist was built in 1906 by splitting an existing house in half, separating the halves and building a new section in between them. The new section consisted of an auditorium with a steep four sided roof-ceiling over it and an entrance porch facing the street.

Current use
First Church of Christ, Scientist is still an active Christian Science church, now known as Christian Science Society, Elyria-Lorain.
,

See also
List of Registered Historic Places in Ohio
 First Church of Christ, Scientist (disambiguation)

References

Churches on the National Register of Historic Places in Ohio
Christian Science churches in Ohio
Churches in Elyria, Ohio
Churches completed in 1906
20th-century Christian Science church buildings
Buildings and structures in Lorain County, Ohio
National Register of Historic Places in Lorain County, Ohio
1906 establishments in Ohio